Arifureta: From Commonplace to World's Strongest is a Japanese light novel series written by Ryo Shirakome and illustrated by Takayaki, based on a web novel, that began in 2015.  A spinoff series, Arifureta: From Commonplace to World's Strongest Zero began in 2017.  In North America, both series are published digitally by J-Novel Club and in print by Seven Seas Entertainment.

The series has received three manga adaptations.  The first, by RoGa, is an adaptation of the main novels.  The second, Arifureta: I Love Isekai, is a yonkoma comedy-spinoff by Misaki Mori.  The third, by Ataru Kamichi, is an adaptation of the Arifureta Zero spinoff novels.  All three series are published in North America by Seven Seas Entertainment.

Light novels

Arifureta: From Commonplace to World's Strongest

Arifureta Zero

Manga

Arifureta

Chapters not yet in tankōbon format
The following chapters have not yet been collected in tankōbon format:

Arifureta: I Love Isekai

Chapters not yet in tankōbon format
The following chapters have not yet been collected in tankōbon format:

Arifureta Zero

Chapters not yet in tankōbon format
The following chapters have not yet been collected in tankōbon format:

References

External links
  at Shōsetsuka ni Narō 
  
  
  
  
  at J-Novel Club
 

Arifureta: From Commonplace to World's Strongest
Arifureta: From Commonplace to World's Strongest